Kilome Constituency is an electoral constituency in Kenya. It is one of six constituencies in Makueni County. The constituency was established for the 1988 elections. The constituency has three wards, all electing councillors for the Makueni County Council. The town of Sultan Hamud is located within Kilome Constituency.

Members of Parliament

Wards

References 

Constituencies in Makueni County
Constituencies in Eastern Province (Kenya)
1988 establishments in Kenya
Constituencies established in 1988